Phyllostominae is a subfamily of bats that include big-eared, spear-nosed, sword-nosed bats and relatives.

List of species
Subfamily: Phyllostominae
 Tribe Micronycterini
Genus: Glyphonycteris
Behn's bat, Glyphonycteris behnii
Davies's big-eared bat, Glyphonycteris daviesi
Tricolored big-eared bat, Glyphonycteris sylvestris
Genus: Lampronycteris
Yellow-throated big-eared bat, Lampronycteris brachyotis
Genus: Macrotus - big-eared bats
California leaf-nosed bat, Macrotus californicus
Waterhouse's leaf-nosed bat, Macrotus waterhousii
Genus: Micronycteris - little big-eared bats
Brosset's big-eared bat, Micronycteris brosseti
Giovanni's big-eared bat, Micronycteris giovanniae
Hairy big-eared bat, Micronycteris hirsuta
Pirlot's big-eared bat, Micronycteris homezi
Matses' big-eared bat, Micronycteris matses
little big-eared bat, Micronycteris megalotis
Common big-eared bat, Micronycteris microtis
white-bellied big-eared bat, Micronycteris minuta
Sanborn's big-eared bat, Micronycteris sanborni
Schmidts's big-eared bat, Micronycteris schmidtorum
Genus: Neonycteris
Least big-eared bat, Neonycteris pusilla
Genus: Trinycteris
Niceforo's big-eared bat, Trinycteris nicefori
 Tribe Vampyrini
Genus: Chrotopterus
big-eared woolly bat, Chrotopterus auritus
Genus: Lophostoma
Equatorial round-eared bat, Lophostoma aequatorialis
Pygmy round-eared bat, Lophostoma brasiliense
Carriker's round-eared bat, Lophostoma carrikeri
Davis's round-eared bat, Lophostoma evotis
Schultz's round-eared bat, Lophostoma schulzi
White-throated round-eared bat, Lophostoma silvicolum
Yasuni round-eared bat, Lophostoma yasuni
Genus: Tonatia - round-eared bats
Greater round-eared bat, Tonatia bidens
Stripe-headed round-eared bat, Tonatia saurophila
Genus: Trachops
Fringe-lipped bat, Trachops cirrhosus
Genus: Vampyrum
Spectral bat, Vampyrum spectrum
 Tribe Lonchorhinini
Genus: Lonchorhina - sword-nosed bats
Tomes's sword-nosed bat, Lonchorhina aurita
Fernandez's sword-nosed bat, Lonchorhina fernandezi
Northern sword-nosed bat, Lonchorhina inusitata
Marinkelle's sword-nosed bat, Lonchorhina marinkellei
Orinoco sword-nosed bat, Lonchorhina orinocensis
Genus: Macrophyllum
Long-legged bat, Macrophyllum macrophyllum
Genus: Mimon - Gray's spear-nosed bats
Golden bat, Mimon bennettii
Cozumelan golden bat, Mimon cozumelae
Striped hairy-nosed bat, Mimon crenulatum
Koepcke's spear-nosed bat, Mimon koepckeae
 Tribe Phyllostomatini
Genus: Phylloderma - Peters's spear-nosed bat
Pale-faced bat, Phylloderma stenops
Genus: Phyllostomus - spear-nosed bats
Pale spear-nosed bat, Phyllostomus discolor
Lesser spear-nosed bat, Phyllostomus elongatus
Greater spear-nosed bat, Phyllostomus hastatus
Guianan spear-nosed bat, Phyllostomus latifolius

References

Phyllostomidae
Taxa named by John Edward Gray